

List of Dioceses

Antilles Episcopal Conference

Ecclesiastical Province of Port of Spain
Archdiocese of Port of Spain
Diocese of Bridgetown
Diocese of Georgetown
Diocese of Kingstown
Diocese of Paramaribo
Diocese of Willemstad

Episcopal Conference of Argentina

Ecclesiastical province of Bahía Blanca 
Archdiocese of Bahía Blanca
Diocese of Alto Valle del Río Negro
Diocese of Comodoro Rivadavia
Diocese of Río Gallegos
Diocese of San Carlos de Bariloche
Diocese of Santa Rosa
Diocese of Viedma

Ecclesiastical province of Buenos Aires 
Archdiocese of Buenos Aires
Diocese of Avellaneda-Lanús
Diocese of Gregorio de Laferrère
Diocese of Lomas de Zamora
Diocese of Morón
Diocese of Merlo-Moreno
Diocese of San Isidro
Diocese of San Justo
Diocese of San Martín
Diocese of San Miguel

Ecclesiastical province of Córdoba 
Archdiocese of Córdoba
Diocese of Cruz del Eje
Diocese of Villa de la Concepción del Río Cuarto
Diocese of San Francisco
Diocese of Villa María
Prelature of Deán Funes

Ecclesiastical province of Corrientes 
Archdiocese of Corrientes
Diocese of Goya
Diocese of Posadas
Diocese of Puerto Iguazú
Diocese of Santo Tomé

Ecclesiastical province of La Plata 
Archdiocese of La Plata
Diocese of Azul
Diocese of Chascomús
Diocese of Mar del Plata
Diocese of Nueve de Julio
Diocese of Quilmes
Diocese of Zárate-Campana

Ecclesiastical province of Mendoza 
Archdiocese of Mendoza
Diocese of Neuquén
Diocese of San Rafael

Ecclesiastical province of Mercedes-Luján 
Archdiocese of Mercedes-Luján

Ecclesiastical province of Paraná 
Archdiocese of Paraná
Diocese of Concordia
Diocese of Gualeguaychú

Ecclesiastical province of Resistencia 
Archdiocese of Resistencia
Diocese of Formosa
Diocese of San Roque de Presidencia Roque Sáenz Peña

Ecclesiastical province of Rosario 
Archdiocese of Rosario
Diocese of San Nicolás de los Arroyos
Diocese of Venado Tuerto

Ecclesiastical province of Salta 
Archdiocese of Salta
Diocese of Catamarca
Diocese of Jujuy
Diocese of Orán
Prelature of Cafayate
Prelature of Humahuaca

Ecclesiastical province of San Juan 
Archdiocese of San Juan de Cuyo
Diocese of La Rioja
Diocese of San Luis

Ecclesiastical province of Santa Fe 
Archdiocese of Santa Fe de la Vera Cruz
Diocese of Rafaela
Diocese of Reconquista

Ecclesiastical province of Tucumán 
Archdiocese of Tucumán
Diocese of Añatuya
Diocese of Concepción
Diocese of Santiago del Estero

Episcopal Conference of Bolivia

Ecclesiastical province of Cochabamba 
Archdiocese of Cochabamba
Diocese of Oruro
Prelature of Aiquile

Ecclesiastical province of La Paz 
Archdiocese of La Paz
Diocese of Coroico
Diocese of El Alto
Prelature of Corocoro

Ecclesiastical province of Santa Cruz de la Sierra 
Archdiocese of Santa Cruz de la Sierra
Diocese of San Ignacio de Velasco

Ecclesiastical province of Sucre 
Archdiocese of Sucre
Diocese of Potosí
Diocese of Tarija

Episcopal Conference of Brazil

Ecclesiastical province of Aparecida 
Archdiocese of Aparecida
Diocese of Caraguatatuba
Diocese of Lorena
Diocese of São José dos Campos
Diocese of Taubaté

Ecclesiastical province of Aracaju 
Archdiocese of Aracaju
Diocese of Estância
Diocese of Propriá

Ecclesiastical province of Belém do Pará 
Archdiocese of Belém do Pará
Diocese of Abaetetuba
Diocese of Bragança do Pará
Diocese of Castanhal
Diocese of Macapá
Diocese of Marabá
Diocese of Óbidos
Diocese of Ponta de Pedras
Diocese of Santarém
Prelature of Cametá
Prelature of Itaituba
Prelature of Marajó
Prelature of Xingu

Ecclesiastical province of Belo Horizonte 
Archdiocese of Belo Horizonte
Diocese of Divinópolis
Diocese of Luz
Diocese of Oliveira
Diocese of Sete Lagoas

Ecclesiastical province of Botucatu 
Archdiocese of Botucatu
Diocese of Araçatuba
Diocese of Assis
Diocese of Bauru
Diocese of Lins
Diocese of Marília
Diocese of Ourinhos
Diocese of Presidente Prudente

Ecclesiastical province of Brasília 
Archdiocese of Brasília
Diocese of Formosa
Diocese of Luziânia
Diocese of Uruaçu

Ecclesiastical province of Campinas 
Archdiocese of Campinas
Diocese of Amparo
Diocese of Bragança Paulista
Diocese of Limeira
Diocese of Piracicaba
Diocese of São Carlos

Ecclesiastical province of Campo Grande 
Archdiocese of Campo Grande
Diocese of Corumbá
Diocese of Coxim
Diocese of Dourados
Diocese of Jardim
Diocese of Naviraí
Diocese of Três Lagoas

Ecclesiastical province of Cascavel 
Diocese of Cascavel
Diocese of Foz do Iguaçu
Diocese of Palmas-Francisco Beltrão
Diocese of Toledo

Ecclesiastical province of Cuiabá 
Archdiocese of Cuiabá
Diocese of Barra do Garças
Diocese of Diamantino
Diocese of Guiratinga
Diocese of Juína
Diocese of Rondonópolis
Diocese of São Luíz de Cáceres
Prelature of Paranatinga
Prelature of São Félix

Ecclesiastical province of Curitiba 
Archdiocese of Curitiba
Diocese of Guarapuava
Diocese of Paranaguá
Diocese of Ponta Grossa
Diocese of União da Vitória
Diocese of São João Batista em Curitiba
Diocese of São José dos Pinhais

Ecclesiastical province of Diamantina 
Archdiocese of Diamantina
Diocese of Almenara
Diocese of Araçuaí
Diocese of Guanhães
Diocese of Teófilo Otoni

Ecclesiastical province of Feira de Santana 
Archdiocese of Feira de Santana
Diocese of Barra do Rio Grande
Diocese of Barreiras
Diocese of Bonfim
Diocese of Irecê
Diocese of Juazeiro
Diocese of Paulo Afonso
Diocese of Ruy Barbosa
Diocese of Serrinha

Ecclesiastical province of Florianópolis 
Archdiocese of Florianópolis
Diocese of Blumenau
Diocese of Caçador
Diocese of Chapecó
Diocese of Criciúma
Diocese of Joaçaba
Diocese of Joinville
diocese of Lages
Diocese of Rio do Sul
Diocese of Tubarão

Ecclesiastical province of Fortaleza 
Archdiocese of Fortaleza
Diocese of Crateús
Diocese of Crato
Diocese of Iguatú
Diocese of Itapipoca
Diocese of Limoeiro do Norte
Diocese of Fortaleza
Diocese of Sobral
Diocese of Tianguá

Ecclesiastical province of Goiânia 
Archdiocese of Goiânia
Diocese of Anápolis
diocese of Goiás
Diocese of Ipameri
Diocese of Itumbiara
Diocese of Jataí
Diocese of Rubiataba-Mozarlândia
Diocese of São Luís de Montes Belos

Ecclesiastical province of Juiz de Fora 
Archdiocese of Juiz de Fora
Diocese of Leopoldina
Diocese of São João del Rei

Ecclesiastical province of Londrina 
Archdiocese of Londrina
Diocese of Apucarana
Diocese of Cornélio Procópio
Diocese of Jacarezinho

Ecclesiastical province of Maceió 
Archdiocese of Maceió
Diocese of Palmeira dos Índios
Diocese of Penedo

Ecclesiastical province of Manaus 
Archdiocese of Manaus
 Diocese of Alto Solimões
 Diocese of Coari
 Diocese of Parintins
 Diocese of Roraima
 Diocese of São Gabriel da Cachoeira
 Territorial Prelature of Borba
 Territorial Prelature of Itacoatiara
 Territorial Prelature of Tefé

Ecclesiastical province of Mariana 
Archdiocese of Mariana
Diocese of Caratinga
Diocese of Governador Valadares
Diocese of Itabira-Fabriciano

Ecclesiastical province of Maringá 
Archdiocese of Maringá
Diocese of Campo Mourão
Diocese of Paranavaí
Diocese of Umuarama

Ecclesiastical province of Montes Claros 
Archdiocese of Montes Claros
Diocese of Janaúba
Diocese of Januária
Diocese of Paracatu

Ecclesiastical province of Natal 
Archdiocese of Natal
Diocese of Caicó
Diocese of Mossoró

Ecclesiastical province of Niterói 
Archdiocese of Niterói
Diocese of Campos
Diocese of Nova Friburgo
Diocese of Petrópolis

Ecclesiastical province of Olinda e Recife 
Archdiocese of Olinda e Recife
Diocese of Afogados da Ingazeira
Diocese of Caruaru
Diocese of Floresta
Diocese of Garanhuns
Diocese of Nazaré
Diocese of Palmares
Diocese of Pesqueira
Diocese of Petrolina

Ecclesiastical province of Palmas 
Archdiocese of Palmas
Diocese of Cristalândia
Diocese of Miracema do Tocantins
Diocese of Porto Nacional
Diocese of Tocantinópolis

Ecclesiastical province of Paraíba 
Archdiocese of Paraíba
Diocese of Cajazieras
Diocese of Campina Grande
Diocese of Guarabira
Diocese of Patos

Ecclesiastical province of Passo Fundo 
Archdiocese of Passo Fundo
Diocese of Erexim
Diocese of Frederico Westphalen
Diocese of Vacaria

Ecclesiastical province of Pelotas 
Archdiocese of Pelotas
Diocese of Bagé
Diocese of Rio Grande

Ecclesiastical province of Porto Alegre 
Archdiocese of Porto Alegre
Diocese of Caxias do Sul
Diocese of Montenegro
Diocese of Novo Hamburgo
Diocese of Osório

Ecclesiastical province of Porto Velho 
Archdiocese of Porto Velho
Diocese of Cruzeiro do Sul
Diocese of Guajará-Mirim
Diocese of Humaitá
Diocese of Ji-Paraná
Diocese of Rio Branco
Prelature of Lábrea

Ecclesiastical province of Pouso Alegre 
Archdiocese of Pouso Alegre
Diocese of Campanha
Diocese of Guaxupé

Ecclesiastical province of Ribeirão Preto 
Archdiocese of Ribeirão Preto
Diocese of Barretos
Diocese of Catanduva
Diocese of Franca
Diocese of Jaboticabal
Diocese of Jales
Diocese of São João da Boa Vista
Diocese of São José do Rio Preto

Ecclesiastical province of Santa Maria 
Archdiocese of Santa Maria
Diocese of Cachoeira do Sul
Diocese of Cruz Alta
Diocese of Santa Cruz do Sul
Diocese of Santo Ângelo
Diocese of Uruguaiana

Ecclesiastical province of São Luís do Maranhão 
Archdiocese of São Luís do Maranhão
Diocese of Bacabal
Diocese of Balsas
Diocese of Brejo
Diocese of Carolina
Diocese of Caxias do Maranhão
Diocese of Coroatá
Diocese of Grajaú
Diocese of Imperatriz
Diocese of Pinheiro
Diocese of Viana
Diocese of Zé-Doca

Ecclesiastical province of São Paulo 
Archdiocese of São Paulo
Diocese of Campo Limpo
Diocese of Caraguatatuba
Diocese of Guarulhos
Diocese of Mogi das Cruzes
Diocese of Nossa Senhora do Líbano em São Paulo
Diocese of Nossa Senhora do Paraíso em São Paulo
Diocese of Osasco
Diocese of Santo Amaro
Diocese of Santo André
Diocese of Santos
Diocese of São Miguel Paulista

Ecclesiastical province of São Salvador da Bahia 
Archdiocese of São Salvador da Bahia
Diocese of Alagoinhas
Diocese of Amargosa
Diocese of Camaçari
Diocese of Eunápolis
Diocese of Ilhéus
Diocese of Itabuna
Diocese of Teixeira de Freitas-Caravelas

Ecclesiastical province of São Sebastião do Rio de Janeiro 
Archdiocese of São Sebastião do Rio de Janeiro
Diocese of Barra do Piraí-Volta Redonda
Diocese of Duque de Caxias
Diocese of Itaguaí
Diocese of Nova Iguaçu
Diocese of Valença

Ecclesiastical province of Sorocaba
Archdiocese of Sorocaba
Diocese of Itapetininga
Diocese of Itapeva
Diocese of Jundiaí
Diocese of Registro

Ecclesiastical province of Teresina
Archdiocese of Teresina
Diocese of Bom Jesus do Gurguéia
Diocese of Campo Maior
Diocese of Floriano
Diocese of Oeiras
Diocese of Parnaíba
Diocese of Picos
Diocese of São Raimundo Nonato

Ecclesiastical province of Uberaba
Archdiocese of Uberaba
Diocese of Ituiutaba
Diocese of Patos de Minas
Diocese of Uberlândia

Ecclesiastical province of Vitória
Archdiocese of Vitória
Diocese of Cachoeiro de Itapemirim
Diocese of Colatina
Diocese of São Mateus

Ecclesiastical province of Vitória da Conquista
Archdiocese of Vitória da Conquista
Diocese of Bom Jesus da Lapa
Diocese of Caetité
Diocese of Jequié
Diocese of Livramento de Nossa Senhora

Episcopal Conference of Chile

Ecclesiastical province of Antofagasta 
Archdiocese of Antofagasta
Diocese of Arica
Diocese of Iquique
Prelature of Calama

Ecclesiastical province of Concepción 
Archdiocese of Concepción
Diocese of Chillán
Diocese of Los Ángeles
Diocese of Temuco
Diocese of Valdivia
Diocese of Villarrica

Ecclesiastical province of La Serena 
Archdiocese of La Serena
Diocese of Copiapó
Prelature of Illapel

Ecclesiastical province of Puerto Montt 
Archdiocese of Puerto Montt
Diocese of Osorno
Diocese of Punta Arenas
Diocese of San Carlos de Ancud

Ecclesiastical province of Santiago de Chile 
Archdiocese of Santiago de Chile
Diocese of Linares
Diocese of Melipilla
Diocese of Rancagua
Diocese of San Bernardo
Diocese of San Filipe
Diocese of Talca
Diocese of Valparaíso

Episcopal Conference of Colombia

Ecclesiastical province of Barranquilla
Archdiocese of Barranquilla
Diocese of El Banco
Diocese of Riohacha
Diocese of Santa Marta
Diocese of Valledupar

Ecclesiastical province of Bogotá
Archdiocese of Bogotá
Diocese of Engativá
Diocese of Facatativá
Diocese of Fontibón
Diocese of Girardot
Diocese of Soacha
Diocese of Zipaquirá

Ecclesiastical province of Bucaramanga
Archdiocese of Bucaramanga
Diocese of Barrancabermeja
Diocese of Málaga-Soatá
Diocese of Socorro y San Gil
Diocese of Vélez

Ecclesiastical province of Cali
Archdiocese of Cali
Diocese of Buenaventura
Diocese of Buga
Diocese of Cartago
Diocese of Palmira

Ecclesiastical province of Cartagena
Archdiocese of Cartagena
Diocese of Magangué
Diocese of Montelibano
Diocese of Monteria
Diocese of Sincelejo

Ecclesiastical province of Florencia
Archdiocese of Florencia
Diocese of Mocoa–Sibundoy  
Diocese of San Vicente del Caguán

Ecclesiastical province of Ibagué
Archdiocese of Ibagué
Diocese of Espinal
Diocese of Garzón
Diocese of Líbano–Honda
Diocese of Neiva

Ecclesiastical province of Manizales
Archdiocese of Manizales
Diocese of Armenia
Diocese of La Dorada-Guaduas
Diocese of Pereira

Ecclesiastical province of Medellín
Archdiocese of Medellín
Diocese of Caldas
Diocese of Girardota
Diocese of Jericó
Diocese of Sonsón-Rionegro

Ecclesiastical province of Nueva Pamplona
Archdiocese of Neuva Pamplona
Diocese of Arauca
Diocese of Cúcuta
Diocese of Ocaña
Diocese of Tibú

Ecclesiastical province of Popayán
Archdiocese of Popayán
Diocese of Ipiales
Diocese of Pasto
Diocese of Tumaco

Ecclesiastical province of Santa Fe de Antioquia
Archdiocese of Santa Fe de Antioquia
Diocese of Apartadó
Diocese of Ismina-Tadó
Diocese of Quibdó
Diocese of Santa Rosa de Osos

Ecclesiastical province of Tunja
Archdiocese of Tunja
Diocese of Chiquinquirá
Diocese of Duitama-Sogamoso
Diocese of Garagoa
Diocese of Yopal

Ecclesiastical province of Villavicencio
Archdiocese of Villavicencio
Diocese of Granada en Colombia
Diocese of San José del Guaviare

Episcopal Conference of Ecuador

Ecclesiastical province of Cuenca 
Archdiocese of Cuenca
Diocese of Azogues
Diocese of Loja
Diocese of Machala

Ecclesiastical province of Guayaquil 
Archdiocese of Guayaquil
Diocese of Babahoyo
Diocese of San Jacinto de Yaguachi

Ecclesiastical province of Portoviejo 
Archdiocese of Portoviejo
Diocese of Santo Domingo de los Colorados

Ecclesiastical province of Quito 
Archdiocese of Quito
Diocese of Ambato
Diocese of Guaranda
Diocese of Ibarra
Diocese of Latacunga
Diocese of Riobamba
Diocese of Tulcán

Episcopal Conference of Paraguay

Ecclesiastical province of Asunción
Archdiocese of Asunción
Diocese of Benjamín Aceval
Diocese of Caacupé
Diocese of Carapeguá
Diocese of Ciudad del Este
Diocese of Concepción en Paraguay
Diocese of Coronel Oviedo
Diocese of Encarnación
Diocese of San Juan Bautista de las Misiones
Diocese of San Lorenzo
Diocese of San Pedro
Diocese of Villarrica del Espíritu Santo

Episcopal Conference of Peru

Ecclesiastical province of Arequipa 
Archdiocese of Arequipa
Diocese of Puno
Diocese of Tacna y Moquegua
Prelature of Ayaviri
Prelature of Chuquibamba
Prelature of Juli

Ecclesiastical province of Ayacucho 
Archdiocese of Ayacucho
Diocese of Huancavélica

Ecclesiastical province of Cuzco 
Archdiocese of Cuzco
Diocese of Abancay
Diocese of Sicuani
Prelature of Chuquibambilla

Ecclesiastical province of Huancayo 
Archdiocese of Huancayo
Diocese of Huánuco
Diocese of Tarma

Ecclesiastical province of Lima 
Archdiocese of Lima
Diocese of Callao
Diocese of Carabayllo
Diocese of Chosica
Diocese of Huacho
Diocese of Ica
Diocese of Talca
Diocese of Lurín
Prelature of Yauyos

Ecclesiastical province of Piura 
Archdiocese of Piura
Diocese of Chachapoyas
Diocese of Chiclayo
Diocese of Chulucanas
Prelature of Chota

Ecclesiastical province of Trujillo 
Archdiocese of Trujillo
Diocese of Cajamarca
Diocese of Chimbote
Diocese of Huaraz
Diocese of Huarí
Prelature of Huamachuco
Prelature of Moyobamba

Episcopal Conference of Uruguay

Ecclesiastical province of Montevideo
Archdiocese of Montevideo
Diocese of Canelones
Diocese of Florida
Diocese of Maldonado-Punta del Este
Diocese of Melo
Diocese of Mercedes
Diocese of Minas
Diocese of Salto
Diocese of San José de Mayo
Diocese of Tacuarembó

Episcopal Conference of Venezuela

Ecclesiastical province of Barquisimeto
Archdiocese of Barquisimeto
Diocese of Acarigua–Araure
Diocese of Carora
Diocese of Guanare
Diocese of San Felipe

Ecclesiastical province of Calabozo
Archdiocese of Calabozo
Diocese of San Fernando de Apure
Diocese of Valle de la Pascua

Ecclesiastical province of Caracas, Santiago de Venezuela
Archdiocese of Caracas, Santiago de Venezuela
Diocese of Guarenas
Diocese of La Guaira
Diocese of Los Teques

Ecclesiastical province of Ciudad Bolívar
Archdiocese of Ciudad Bolívar
Diocese of Ciudad Guayana
Diocese of Maturín

Ecclesiastical province of Coro
Archdiocese of Coro
Diocese of Punto Fijo

Ecclesiastical province of Cumaná
Archdiocese of Cumaná
Diocese of Barcelona
Diocese of Carúpano
Diocese of Margarita

Ecclesiastical province of Maracaibo
Archdiocese of Maracaibo
Diocese of Cabimas
Diocese of El Vigia-San Carlos del Zulia
Diocese of Machiques

Ecclesiastical province of Mérida
Archdiocese of Mérida
Diocese of Barinas
Diocese of San Cristóbal de Venezuela
Diocese of Trujillo

Ecclesiastical province of Valencia en Venezuela
Archdiocese of Valencia en Venezuela
Diocese of Maracay
Diocese of Puerto Cabello
Diocese of San Carlos de Venezuela

Sources
 http://www.catholic-hierarchy.org/diocese/qview3.html

Roman Catholic dioceses
South America